Hi-Five's Greatest Hits is the first greatest hits album by American group Hi-Five. It was released October 11, 1994 on Jive Records, shortly after the group's disbandment. It consists of hit singles from their first three albums released from 1990 to 1994.

Track listing

References

External links 
 

1994 greatest hits albums
Hi-Five albums
Jive Records albums